The New Democracy Party of China (NDPC) is a political party that started in the People's Republic of China, and is banned by the Chinese government. It was established by Mr. Guo Quan, a professor at Nanjing Normal University in 2007 after he published an open letter to the leaders of China. The second acting chairman is Mr. Cunzhu Zheng, who was also a student leader in Anhui Province in 1989's Tiananmen Square Protests.

About Guo Quan
New Democracy Party of China was founded by Guo Quan, a former associate professor at Nanjing Normal University and the acting chairman of the newly established New Democracy Party of China, was arrested by police near his Nanjing home.  "He tried to set up an opposition party, they accused him of 'subversion of state power,' " Mr. Guo's wife said.  "They told me that he had been formally arrested, but they didn't give me any details," Li said. "They gave a bunch of documents to his mother."

Nanjing Police Department agents sent Mr. Guo’s mother a letter denying her request to hire a lawyer because her son’s case involved "state secrets."  She says, “(They) arrested my son and forbade us to visit him and hire a lawyer. Does that mean they are going to try him secretly? I am upset! My son was arrested for being a human rights activist; now who is going to protect his human rights? I love my son, so I hired a lawyer, but the regime would not let the lawyer accept the case. How could his only act, writing an open letter to Hu Jintao, be deemed subversion?”  The authorities denied Guo’s family attorney’s request to visit him.

Mr. Guo’s defense attorney Guo Lianhui commented that Guo made his differing political views public, and the authorities mobilized the state machinery to suppress him.  “My client published a series of articles called ‘Democratic Voice’ and pointed out that there is no democracy and observance of human rights in China." attorney Guo Lianhui added.

Mr. Guo founded New Democracy Party of China to represent anyone petitioning the government and the ruling Communist Party for social justice in land disputes, forced evictions, and allegations of official wrongdoing.  He wrote 347 articles and offered constructive suggestions to the Chinese Communist Party.  However, Mr. Guo was fired from Nanjing Normal University for allegedly violating its constitution and rules on the conduct of faculty.  Then, Mr. Guo was expelled from the Communist-approved token opposition group Democratic Parties and Factions.

On October 15, 2009, Mr. Guo was sentenced to serve ten years in prison.

Present
After the party founder Mr. Guo Quan was arrested on November 13, 2008, Mr. Cunzhu Zheng was selected by other party members in China to be the second acting chairman of the Party. The website of the party was created in January 2009 and there are about 10 Chinese political dissidents and democratic supporters in Los Angeles and San Francisco applied to be the member of the party and the headquarters of the party moved to the USA after Mr. Guo Quan was arrested.

References

External links
China New Democracy Party
China Democracy Party in California

Anti-communist parties
Banned political parties in China
Political parties established in 2007